The 2011 Auto Club 400 was a NASCAR Sprint Cup Series stock car race that was held on March 27, 2011 at Auto Club Speedway in Fontana, California. Contested over 200 laps, it was the fifth race of the 2011 season.  The race was won by Kevin Harvick for the Richard Childress Racing team. Jimmie Johnson finished second, and Tony Stewart clinched third.

There were four cautions and 18 lead changes among ten different drivers throughout the course of the race. It was Harvick's first win in the 2011 season, and the 15th of his Sprint Cup Series career. The result moved Harvick up to the ninth position in the Drivers' Championship, 30 points behind Carl Edwards in first. Toyota became the leader in the Manufacturers' Championship, tied with Chevrolet, and Ford, with 31 races remaining in the season.  A total of 88,000 people attended the race.

Report

Background

Auto Club Speedway is one of six superspeedways to hold NASCAR races. The track's turns are banked at fourteen degrees, while the front stretch, the location of the finish line, is banked at eleven degrees. The back stretch has 3 degrees of banking. The racetrack has seats for 92,100 spectators.

Before the race, Kurt Busch was leading the Drivers' Championship with 150 points, one point ahead of Carl Edwards in second. Tony Stewart and Ryan Newman followed in third and fourth with 138 points, two ahead of Paul Menard and five ahead of Kyle Busch in fifth and sixth. Jimmie Johnson, with 130, was in the seventh position ahead of Juan Pablo Montoya and Dale Earnhardt Jr. Martin Truex Jr. rounded out the first ten positions with 123 points. In the Manufacturers' Championship, Ford was first with 27 points, two ahead of Toyota and five ahead of Chevrolet. Dodge was in the fourth positions with 14 points. Jimmie Johnson was the race's defending winner from 2010.

Practice and qualifying

Three practice sessions are scheduled to be held before the race; the first on Friday, which lasted only 45 minutes after a rain delay. The second and third were both on Saturday afternoon, and lasted 45 and 60 minutes long. David Reutimann was quickest with a time of 38.680 seconds in the first session, 0.263 seconds faster than Denny Hamlin. Greg Biffle was just off Hamlin's pace, followed by Brad Keselowski, Jamie McMurray, and Kasey Kahne. Montoya was seventh, still within a second of Reutimann's time.

Forty-three cars were entered for qualifying. Montoya clinched the sixth pole position of his career, with a time of 38.992 seconds. He was joined on the front row of the grid by Hamlin. Joey Logano qualified third, Regan Smith took fourth, and Stewart started fifth. David Ragan, Jeff Burton, Kyle Busch, Newman and Mark Martin rounded out the top ten. Once the qualifying session concluded, Montoya stated, "It seems like we have a lot of potential this year and it’s pretty exciting. Pit crew is doing an amazing job week in and week out. They are getting so much faster than they were doing before. Just everybody on the team is really excited and pumped up — it’s nice to see."

In the second practice session, Kevin Harvick was fastest with a time of 39.747 seconds, more than six hundredths of a second quicker than second-placed Hamlin. Edwards took third place, ahead of Kyle Busch, Jeff Gordon and Stewart. In the third and final practice, Ragan was quickest with a time of 39.785 seconds. Stewart followed in second, ahead of Edwards and Martin. Gordon remained fifth quickest from the second session, with a time of 39.929 seconds. Kyle Busch, Bowyer, Menard, Trevor Bayne, and Burton rounded out the first ten positions.

Race

The race, the fifth in the season, began a 3:00 p.m. EST and was televised live in the United States on Fox. Motor Racing Outreach's Jeff Hamilton began pre-race ceremonies, by giving the invocation. Next, Zanzibar Records recording artist Richard Marx  performed the national anthem, and Actor Christian Slater gave the command for drivers to start their engines.

Results

Qualifying

Race results

Standings after the race

Drivers' Championship standings

Manufacturers' Championship standings

Note: Only the top five positions are included for the driver standings.

References

Auto Club 400
Auto Club 400
NASCAR races at Auto Club Speedway
March 2011 sports events in the United States